Morwad is a village in the Karmala taluka of Solapur district in Maharashtra state, India.

Demographics
Covering  and comprising 346 households at the time of the 2011 census of India, Morwad had a population of 1734. There were 897 males and 837 females, with 204 people being aged six or younger.

References

Villages in Karmala taluka